The 1976 Bristol City Council election took place on 6 May 1976 to elect members of Bristol City Council in England. This was on the same day as other local elections. Labour retained overall control of the council despite losing 9 seats to the Conservatives.

Ward results

Avon

Bedminster

Bishopston

Bishopsworth

Brislington

Cabot

Clifton

District

Durdham

Easton

Eastville

Henbury

Hengrove

Hillfields

Horfield

Knowle

Redland

Somerset

Southmead

Southville

St George East

St George West

St Paul

St Philip & Jacob

Stapleton

Stockwood

Westbury-on-Trym

Windmill Hill

References

1976 English local elections
1976
May 1976 events in the United Kingdom
1970s in Bristol